Bharatiya Vidya Bhavan's Sri Venkateswara Vidalaya commonly known as Bharatiya Vidya Bhavan which is situated in Tirupati is an coeducational, day school recognized by Central Board of Secondary Education serving students from pre school to 12th standard in Tirupati. The school was inaugurated on 2 June 1990 by C Subramaniam. Medium of teaching is English language. This school was first situated in Saptagiri Nagar but later relocated to Alipiri.

References 

 
Buildings and structures in Tirupati
1990 establishments in Andhra Pradesh
Educational institutions established in 1990